Permalight is the fourth album by indie rock band Rogue Wave. It is the first to feature new bassist Cameron Jasper. The album was released on March 2, 2010.

References

2010 albums
Rogue Wave (band) albums